Katja Fennel is an oceanographer studying the effects of climate change on marine ecosystems. She is a full professor in the Department of Oceanography at Dalhousie University, a former Canada Research Chair in marine prediction, and co-editor-in-chief of the journal Biogeosciences.

Life
Katja Fennel was born in Rostock. Her father was an professor and oceanographer at the Leibniz Institute for Baltic Sea Research. Her brother is professor for theoretical physics at the University of Rostock. 

Katja Fennel studied mathematics at the University of Rostock, where she wrote her diploma thesis in numerical Analysis about the Ekman layer. She received her PhD in 1998 with a thesis in the field of marine biology. After postdoctoral work at the Alfred Wegener Institute's Helmholtz Centre for Polar and Marine Research and Oregon State University, she became an assistant professor at Rutgers University in 2002. Four years later she moved to Dalhousie University as a Canada Research Chair in marine prediction. She is currently a full professor in the Dalhousie University Department of Oceanography.

Fennel's research focuses on the development and use of computational models to predict and understand marine ecosystems, particularly the causes and effects of changes in oxygen and carbon levels. Her publications have been cited thousands of times. Her work was part of a 2018 publication in Nature Climate Change that found a link between current flows and rapid deoxygenation of the Gulf of St. Lawrence, which the team attributed to broader changes in ocean flows as part of climate change. Fennel is co-editor-in-chief of Biogeosciences, an open access journal covering the earth sciences. In 2018 Fennel was the Ian Morris Scholar in Residence at the Center for Environmental Science at the University of Maryland. In 2019 she was announced as a keynote speaker at the 12th Baltic Sea Science Congress.

Fennel has over 200 publications, resulting in over 5,700 citations, and an h-index and i10-index of 37 and 83 respectively.

Selected publications

References

External links

Living people
Academic journal editors
Canada Research Chairs
Academic staff of the Dalhousie University
German women academics
Women marine biologists
Year of birth missing (living people)
Canadian women academics